Sittipan Chumchuay (born April 25, 1988) is a former professional footballer from Thailand.

References

1988 births
Living people
Sittipan Chumchuay
Sittipan Chumchuay
Association football forwards
Sittipan Chumchuay
Sittipan Chumchuay
Sittipan Chumchuay
Sittipan Chumchuay
Sittipan Chumchuay
Sittipan Chumchuay
Sittipan Chumchuay
Sittipan Chumchuay
Sittipan Chumchuay